The Uncompahgre Wilderness (formerly called the Big Blue Wilderness) is a U.S. Wilderness Area in southwest Colorado comprising .

Mining claim
Located within the Uncompahgre Wilderness is the Robin Redbreast Gold Mine, owned by Robert and Marjorie Miller of Montrose, Colorado.  Marjorie Miller's father staked the claims in 1938, more than 50 years before the land was designated Wilderness, and was preserved by the General Mining Act of 1872.  The Forest Service has established requirements that would lessen mining impacts, such as reducing motorized vehicle use and night lighting.  The Millers say workers will use picks and shovels to extract ore, haul it out with mule teams over existing trails, and use helicopters to deliver larger equipment to avoid the impacts of truck use.  Environmental groups have expressed concern that Acid Rock Drainage and the human footprint created by mining activities will degrade the Wilderness.

Notes

Protected areas of Gunnison County, Colorado
Protected areas of Hinsdale County, Colorado
IUCN Category Ib
Protected areas of Ouray County, Colorado
Wilderness areas of Colorado
Protected areas established in 1980
Uncompahgre National Forest